Tashvir (also Romanized as Tashvīr) is a village in, and the capital of, Tashvir Rural District of Gilvan District, Tarom County, Zanjan province, Iran. At the 2006 National Census, its population was 1,241 in 298 households. The following census in 2011 counted 1,255 people in 321 households. The latest census in 2016 showed a population of 1,249 people in 378 households.

References 

Tarom County

Populated places in Zanjan Province

Populated places in Tarom County